Mark Feeney (born July 28, 1957) is an author and arts writer for The Boston Globe for over four decades. He is the author of two books, Nixon at the Movies (2004) and Nixon and the Silver Screen (2012). Feeney is a native of Cambridge, Massachusetts.

Life and work
Feeney graduated from Harvard in 1979 with a magna cum laude degree in History and Literature. He has worked for the Globe since then, as a researcher, reporter, reviewer, editor and staff writer at The Boston Globe Magazine.

He has taught at Yale, (2010) Brandeis, Princeton, (2007) and Brown (2014) universities. During spring 2014 he was an Institute for the Liberal Arts journalism fellow at Boston College.

A finalist for the 1994 Pulitzer Prize for Feature Writing, he won the 2008 Pulitzer Prize for Criticism for his "penetrating and versatile command of the visual arts, from film and photography to painting."   In 2009, he was a Foster Distinguished Writer at Penn State University. In 2010, he delivered the Clarice Smith Distinguished Lecture in American Art at the Smithsonian American Art Museum.

Awards and recognition 

 1994 Finalist, Pulitzer Prize for Feature Writing, for his profile of President Nixon
 2010 Alan Miller Fund Visiting Journalist, University of Maine at Orono
 2010 Clarice Smith Distinguished Lecturer in American Art, Smithsonian American Art Museum
 2009 Foster Distinguished Writer, Pennsylvania State University
 2008 Pulitzer Prize for Criticism for his command of the visual arts

Publications
Nixon at the Movies. Chicago, IL: University of Chicago Press, 2004. .
Nixon and the Silver Screen. Chicago, IL: University of Chicago Press, 2013. .

References

External links
Boston Globe recent articles
In the Boston Globe

The Boston Globe people
Harvard College alumni
Pulitzer Prize for Criticism winners
Living people
1957 births
20th-century American journalists
American male journalists